AutoMag, originally spelled Auto Mag, can refer to one of a series of semi-automatic pistols developed by Harry Sanford and later produced by a variety of firms, including made by Arcadia Machine & Tool (AMT): 
Auto Mag Pistol, .44 Automag semi-automatic pistol 
and subsequently: 
AMT AutoMag II, .22 Magnum semi-automatic pistol 
AMT AutoMag III, .30 Carbine semi-automatic pistol 
AMT AutoMag IV, .45 Winchester Magnum semi-automatic pistol 
AMT AutoMag V, .50 Action Express Magnum semi-automatic pistol 

Semi-automatic pistols